Research Centre for Deep Drilling is high-tech laboratory focused on research and development of new deep drilling concept based on electrical plasma. It was established by GA Drilling, former Geothermal Anywhere company in the premises of Slovak Academy of Sciences in Bratislava, Slovakia. The Research centre was officially opened on 10 October 2010 as a result of long-term activities whose aim is to support the geothermal technology research and development in Slovakia. In October 2012, GA Drilling officially moved from Research Center for Deep Drilling to newly founded GA Drilling Technology Center.

High-energetic electrical plasma

High-energetic electrical plasma is a promising technology which is currently being developed in deep drilling applications. It has lower energy efficiency than some of the other technologies, but has several other advantages. The most important are utilization in water environment or producing boreholes with wide range of diameters. The research team from Slovakia is developing drilling concept based on electrical plasma principle suitable for several drilling applications. The core of the research is held in Research Centre for Deep Drilling.

See also
Plasma (physics)
Enhanced geothermal system
Plasma deep drilling technology
Geothermal Anywhere
New drilling technologies
Plasma deep drilling technology

External links
Official press release from the opening of Research Centre for Deep Drilling
Post about the official opening at Geothermania blog

Drilling technology
Geothermal drilling
Mining organizations